"Little Town" is a new arrangement of the traditional Christmas carol "O Little Town of Bethlehem" by English singer-songwriter Chris Eaton. Eaton adapted the lyrics (with some rearrangement of parts of verses) to a new melody he composed in a contemporary Christmas music style. It was first recorded by English singer Cliff Richard and released as a single in the UK for the 1982 Christmas season, reaching number 11 on the UK Singles Chart.

In the US, the better known version is the rendition by renowned CCM artist, Amy Grant, who included it on her 1983 album A Christmas Album.

Cliff Richard original
"Little Town" was released in November 1982 as the third single from Richard's 1982 studio album Now You See Me, Now You Don't. It peaked at number 11 for two weeks on the UK Singles Chart over the Christmas week and the following week. The recording featured singer and vocal arranger Tony Rivers and countertenor Nigel Perrin.

Personnel 
As per the album liner notes:

 Cliff Richard – lead vocal, backing vocals
 Tony Rivers – backing vocals, vocal arrangement
 Nigel Perrin – backing vocals, countertenor solo vocal
 Martyn Ford – orchestra conductor
 Craig Pruess – orchestral arrangement, piano, synthesizers, sequencers, electronic percussion, sleigh bells
 Graham Jarvis – drums
 Orchestra:
 Dave Arnold – Timpani, chimes
 John Wilbraham – trumpet
 Crispian Steele-Perkins – trumpet
 Paul Cosh – trumpet
 Ted Hobart – trumpet
 Michael Laird – trumpet
 Gerry Ruddock – trumpet
 Mark Emney – trumpet
 Simon Ferguson – trumpet
 Jeff Bryant – French horn
 John Pigneevy – French horn
 Chris Larkin – French horn
 John Rooke – French horn
 Robin Davies – French horn
 Phillip Eastop – French horn
 Geoff Perkins – bass trombone
 Steve Saunders – bass trombone
 John Iveson – tenor trombone
 Dave Purser – tenor trombone
 Michael Hext – tenor trombone
 David Whitson – tenor trombone
 Paul Beer – tenor trombone
 Roger Brenner – tenor trombone
 Ian Anderson – double bass
 Michael Brittain – double bass
 Chris Laurence – double bass

Chart performance

Release
The song was first released on 30 August 1982 on Richard's studio album Now You See Me, Now You Don't. The single was released in the UK on the 15 November 1982 in the standard 7-inch vinyl format with picture cover, and also as a 7-inch picture disc variant. On the B-side were "Love and a Helping Hand" and "You, Me and Jesus", except in the US/Canada, where "Be in My Heart" (from the album) was used instead.

In 1988, the song was included on Richard's compilation album Private Collection: 1979–1988 and as an extra B-side on the 12-inch and CD single of his UK Christmas hit "Mistletoe and Wine".

A remixed version of the song with additional instrumentation was included on Richard's 1991 and 2003 Christmas albums Together with Cliff Richard and Cliff at Christmas. The song has also been included on some compilation box sets, The Singles Collection (2002) and ...And They Said it Wouldn't Last (2008).

Amy Grant version
In 1983, CCM artist Amy Grant recorded a slightly more upbeat version of the song on her Christmas album, A Christmas Album.

External links
 Transcription: "Little Town", Cliff Richard by Mike Beecher, December 1982, Electronics & Music Maker archive at mu:zines
 Magazine article: Cliff Richard - music making and his latest LP 'Now You See Me... Now You Don't' by Mike Beecher, December 1982, Electronics & Music Maker archive at mu:zines
 Retrospective review: From Mainstream to CCM: Cliff Richard's Story by Philips Mayaab, March 2019, ccmclassic.com, New Hope Management

References

1982 singles
1982 songs
British Christmas songs
Songs written by Chris Eaton (UK musician)
Cliff Richard songs
Amy Grant songs